Rus is a Romanian, Slovene, and Dutch surname that may refer to:

Romanians 
Daniela L. Rus, Romanian-born, working in US as a roboticist
Ioan Rus Romanian politician (born 1955)
Iosif Rus, Romanian general and politician, chief of Securitate
Laura Rus (born 1987), Romanian footballer
Laurențiu Rus (born 1985), Romanian footballer

Slovenians
Veljko Rus (1929 - 2018), Slovenian sociologist

Dutch 

 Arantxa Rus (born 1990), Dutch professional tennis player residing in Spain

See also 
Rusu (disambiguation)
Rusca (disambiguation)
Ruseni (disambiguation)
Rusești (disambiguation)
Rusciori (disambiguation)

Romanian-language surnames